High Velocity Bowling is a virtual bowling sports game available from the PlayStation Network, and available for download Via the PlayStation Store. The game was released in 2007 for the PlayStation 3. The game was developed by San Diego Studio's in-house studio, Team Ramrod, and published by Sony Computer Entertainment. The game was first announced at the SCEA's Gamers Day 2007 at their Santa Monica Studios. The European release date was originally scheduled for an April 2008 release, but this was then delayed until May because of the new and improved PlayStation Store, included in Firmware 2.3. The game was released in the PAL region on May 6, 2008. On September 21, 2010, an update made the game playable with the PlayStation Move controller.

Gameplay
High Velocity Bowling varies from other bowling games by introducing a challenge mode. The player has to go through every level to unlock all of the 10 playable characters and all of the 10 lanes. Each level has three challenges to complete.  These challenges can be tournaments, matches or trick shots, where the objective is to get a strike while following a certain road.  The game also has a trophy room, in which the player can see his trophies, rings and patches he gained through the game. While the player can use the Sixaxis for the bowling swing, there are other control schemes in the game. Finally, High Velocity Bowling has a multiplayer mode, where up to four people can play online and offline. At Tokyo Game Show 2009 it was confirmed that High Velocity Bowling would get an update that would add support for PlayStation Move.

Reception

The game received "average" reviews according to the review aggregation website Metacritic. In Japan, where the Move edition was ported for release as Free! Free! Bowling on December 9, 2010, Famitsu gave it a score of one six, two sevens, and one five for a total of 25 out of 40.

References

External links

2007 video games
Bowling video games
PlayStation 3 games
PlayStation 3-only games
PlayStation Move-compatible games
PlayStation Network games
Sony Interactive Entertainment games
Video games developed in the United States
San Diego Studio games